Little Topar is a village on the Barrier Highway in Western New South Wales, between Broken Hill and Wilcannia, New South Wales.

The village is in the Tandora County.

References

Towns in New South Wales
Unincorporated Far West Region